Petaling Jaya is divided into several sections. Some sections themselves are subdivided into smaller neighbourhoods (kejiranan), for example SS5D. Some sections have their own names (SS1 is Kampung Tunku), while other sections are grouped together (SS4, SS5, SS6, and SS7 are part of Kelana Jaya).

Addressing format
These sections names are used in the addressing format for locations in Petaling Jaya.

No. 15, Jalan SS20/6,
SS20,
47300 Petaling Jaya,
Selangor

This system would point to house number xx, 5th street, SS3, Petaling Jaya. This would remove the need to have an additional address line for the housing estate name (in this example, Taman Subang) like most addresses used for the rest of the country.

The city sections are numbered as such that the older sections have no prefixes to their section number (Section 1, Section 9) while later sections have prefixes such as SS (Sungei Way-Subang), PJS (Petaling Jaya Selatan) and PJU (Petaling Jaya Utara).

List of Petaling Jaya city sections and postal codes

Section 1-5, 51, 51A, 52, 6-14, 16, 17, 17A, and 18-22

SS1-SS9, SS9A, SS10, SS11, SS20-SS22, SS22A, SS23-SS26

Note: The missing neighbourhood between SS11 and SS20 (SS12 until SS19), are within Subang Jaya, under the jurisdiction of the Subang Jaya Municipal Council.

PJU1, PJU1A, PJU2-PJU10

(*) Note: PJU9 (Bandar Sri Damansara) the only section/township in Petaling Jaya using the same postcode of Kuala Lumpur.

PJS1-PJS6, PJS7, PJS8, PJS10

(*) Note: Only a small portion eastern part of PJS7 is under the jurisdiction of the Petaling Jaya City Council. The remaining part of PJS7 together with PJS9 and PJS11 (Southern part of Bandar Sunway township) are within Subang Jaya, under the jurisdiction of the Subang Jaya City Council.

Petaling Jaya